Paracedemon ruber is a species of beetle in the family Cerambycidae. It was described by Stephan von Breuning in 1942.

Subspecies
 Paracedemon ruber rufoscapus Breuning, 1970
 Paracedemon ruber ruber Breuning, 1942

References

Tragocephalini
Beetles described in 1942